Code (Indonesian: Kali Code) is the name of a river that flows through the city of Yogyakarta on the island of Java, Indonesia. Pollution is a problem along the river. Sayidan Bridge crosses the river.

Geography 
The river flows in the southern central area of Java with predominantly tropical savanna climate (designated as As in the Köppen-Geiger climate classification). The annual average temperature in the area is 24 °C. The warmest month is September, when the average temperature is around 27 °C, and the coldest is April, at 20 °C. The average annual rainfall is 2802 mm. The wettest month is January, with an average of 538 mm rainfall, and the driest is September, with 8 mm rainfall.

Settlements 
Settlements by poor people have been created beside the river over time.  Also loss of housing close to the river has occurred during severe eruptions from Mount Merapi.

References

Rivers of Yogyakarta
Rivers of Indonesia